The 2023 WST Classic is a professional snooker tournament that is taking place from 16 to 22 March 2023 at the Morningside Arena in Leicester, England. It is the 13th ranking event of the 2022–23 season and the inaugural staging of the WST Classic, which the World Snooker Tour added to the calendar midway through the season to replace the cancelled 2023 Turkish Masters. The last qualifying event before the 2023 Tour Championship, the tournament is being streamed on Matchroom.Live in all territories apart from China, Hong Kong, and Thailand, where it is being carried by local broadcasters. The winner will receive £80,000 from a total prize fund of £427,000.

Judd Trump made his 900th century break in professional competition during his first-round match against David Lilley, becoming the third player—after Ronnie O'Sullivan and John Higgins—to reach that milestone. 

Thepchaiya Un-Nooh made the 186th official maximum break in the fifth frame of his last-64 match against Xu Si. This was Un-Nooh's fourth competitive maximum break.

Format 
The tournament features 128 players. The top 64 players in the snooker world rankings after the Players Championship were seeded in the draw, with the remaining 64 players drawn at random against them. Matches are being played as the best of seven  up to and including the quarter-finals. The semi-finals will be played over the best of nine frames. The final will be played over the best of 11 frames.

Prize fund 
The event features a prize fund of £427,000, with the winner receiving £80,000. The breakdown of prize money for this event is shown below:

 Winner: £80,000
 Runner-up: £35,000
 Semi-final: £17,500
 Quarter-final: £11,000
 Last 16: £7,500
 Last 32: £4,500
 Last 64: £3,000
 Highest break: £5,000
 Total: £427,000

Tournament draw

Top half

Section 1

Section 2

Section 3

Section 4

Bottom half

Section 5

Section 6

Section 7

Section 8

Finals

Final

Century breaks
A total of 63 century breaks have been made during the event.

 147, 115  Thepchaiya Un-Nooh
 143, 140  Shaun Murphy
 141  Daniel Wells
 140  Mark Joyce
 138, 130  Xu Si
 137, 104  Ronnie O'Sullivan
 137  Stephen Maguire
 136  Andrew Higginson
 135, 104  Hossein Vafaei
 135  Anthony McGill
 135  Gary Wilson
 133  Ding Junhui
 132  Jimmy White
 131, 113  Judd Trump
 131  Jamie Jones
 131  Andrew Pagett
 130  Graeme Dott
 129, 112  Barry Hawkins
 129, 101  Jack Lisowski
 128, 102, 102  Zhou Yuelong
 128  John J. Astley
 127  Tom Ford
 123  Si Jiahui
 122  Xiao Guodong
 120, 117  Lyu Haotian
 115, 113  Haydon Pinhey
 115, 103  Chris Wakelin
 113, 100  David Gilbert
 110  Jackson Page
 109  Stuart Bingham
 109  Lukas Kleckers
 109  Matthew Selt
 107  Anton Kazakov
 107  Ben Mertens
 105, 101  Kyren Wilson
 105  Jenson Kendrick
 104, 103  Jamie Clarke
 104  Anthony Hamilton
 103, 100  Neil Robertson
 102  Mark Davis
 102  John Higgins
 101  James Cahill
 101  Dechawat Poomjaeng
 100  Fan Zhengyi
 100  Liam Highfield
 100  Yuan Sijun

Notes

References 

WST Classic
WST Classic
WST Classic
Snooker competitions in England
Sport in Leicester
WST Classic